United Nations Security Council Resolution 434, adopted on September 18, 1978, after reaffirming previous resolutions, including 425 (1978), 426 (1978) and 427 (1978), the Council commended the United Nations Interim Force in Lebanon for its work in Southern Lebanon, but expressed concern for the situation in Lebanon as a whole. The decision came in the context of the Lebanese Civil War and Palestinian insurgency in South Lebanon.

The Council also noted with concern the fact that the UN Interim Force could not operate freely throughout the area, while expressing grief at the loss of some of its members. Therefore, in response to a request from the Government of Lebanon, the Council:

 (a) renewed the mandate of United Nations Interim Force for four months until January 19, 1979;
 (b) called upon Israel, Lebanon and others to implement the prior resolutions;
 (c) requested the Secretary-General to report in two months on the progress made on implementing the resolution.

Resolution 434 was adopted by 12 votes to none, while Czechoslovakia and the Soviet Union abstained, and China did not participate.

See also
 1978 South Lebanon conflict
 Blue Line
 History of Lebanon
 List of United Nations Security Council Resolutions 401 to 500 (1976–1982)

References
Text of the Resolution at undocs.org

External links
 

 0434
Palestinian insurgency in South Lebanon
Lebanese Civil War
 0434
1978 in Israel
1978 in Lebanon
 0434
September 1978 events